Jessica Lee (born December 12, 1999) is an American professional figure skater.

Career
She and her previous partner, Robert Hennings, are the 2014 International Challenge Cup Junior Pairs Champions, the 2014 US National Novice Pairs Bronze Medalists, and the 2014 Pacific Coast Sectional Novice Pairs Silver Medalists.  Also with Hennings, Lee competed at two Junior Grand Prix events in Tallinn, Estonia  and Zagreb, Croatia  and placed 11th and 9th, respectively.  In October 2014, after their two Junior Grand Prix events, Lee and Hennings ended their partnership.

Lee and Kozlowski teamed up in April 2015 and competed as a Junior pair team in the 2015-2016 season.

In September 2017, Lee retired from competitive skating and joined Disney On Ice as a professional figure skater. She currently portrays the role of Anna in Disney On Ice presents "Celebrate Memories."

Programs
with Kozlowski

with Hennings

Results
with Kozlowski

with Hennings

References

External links
http://web.icenetwork.com/skaters/team/lee_hennings
http://www.lhsoc.org/podium/default.aspx?t=204&tn=International+skater+gets+best+of+both+worlds&nid=723662&ptid=138572&sdb=False&pf=pgt&mode=0&vcm=False

1999 births
Living people
American female pair skaters
21st-century American women